Pankaj Kapur (born 29 May 1954) is an Indian actor who has worked in Hindi theatre, television and films. He has appeared in several television serials and films. He is the recipient of several awards, including a Filmfare Award and three National Film Awards. His most acclaimed film roles to date have been that of Inspector P.K. in Raakh (1989), Dr. Dipankar Roy in Ek Doctor Ki Maut (1991) and Abba ji, (based on Shakespeare's King Duncan) in Vishal Bhardwaj's adaptation of Macbeth; Maqbool (2004).

In the 1980s, he became a household name through the TV series Karamchand, a comedy television series in the detective genre. And in the millennium, Office Office, a comic satire on prevalent corruption in India.

In 1988, he married his second wife, actress Supriya Pathak, daughter of actress Dina Pathak, with whom he has a daughter and a son. His sister-in-law is actress Ratna Pathak Shah, who is married to actor Naseeruddin Shah. His son (from his first marriage to actress Neelima Azeem) is actor Shahid Kapoor.

Early and personal life 

Pankaj Kapur was born on 29 May 1954 in a Khatri family Ludhiana, Punjab. He completed his education in Punjab and developed a keen interest in theatre and acting while growing up. He then enrolled in the National School of Drama to pursue his interest.

He married actress and dancer Neelima Azeem in 1979. They were settled in New Delhi where they had their only child Shahid Kapoor in 1981. The couple divorced in 1984.

Pankaj Kapur went on to marry actress Supriya Pathak in 1988. They have one daughter Sanah Kapur and a son Ruhaan Kapur.

Career

After graduating from National School of Drama, he did theatre for the next four years, until he was offered a role in Gandhi by Richard Attenborough. Over the years, as a director, he has done over 74 plays and serials, including Mohandas B.A.L.L.B., Wah Bhai Wah, Sahabji Biwiji Ghulamji and Drishtanth, Kanak Di Balli, Albert's Bridge and Panchvan Savaar.

He made his film debut with Shyam Benegal's film Arohan (1982). Following that he played Mahatma Gandhi's second secretary, Pyarelal Nayyar, in the Richard Attenborough film Gandhi in 1982. Later he dubbed for Ben Kingsley in the Hindi version of the film.

Thereafter he appeared in a string of art films that came under the parallel cinema category, with leading art films directors, starting with Shyam Benegal's Mandi (1983), Kundan Shah's comedy Jaane Bhi Do Yaaro again in 1983. This was followed by Saeed Akhtar Mirza satirical Mohan Joshi Hazir Ho! (1984), Mrinal Sen's Khandhar (1984), and Vidhu Vinod Chopra's suspense thriller Khamosh in 1985. He appeared in a number of art films, many of which went on to win National Film Awards.

In 1986, he switched to television, with the role of Karamchand jasoos(detective) in the detective-comedy, Karamchand, also starring Sushmita Mukherjee. Over the years he has been seen in numerous TV serials, including, Kab Tak Pukaroon (Doordarshan) Zabaan Sambhaal Ke (a remake of the English TV series, Mind Your Language), Lifeline with Vijaya Mehta, Neem ka Ped and finally comic interludes in Philips Top 10.

Meanwhile, his tryst with art cinema continued, as he starred in films like Chameli Ki Shaadi (1986), Ek Ruka Hua Faisla (1986), and Yeh Woh Manzil To Nahin (1987). In 1987, his comic side was visible again in the commercial action film Jalwa, also starring Naseeruddin Shah.

His first National Film Award came with the 1989 film, Raakh, which also starred Aamir Khan.

He starred in the classic Punjabi film Marhi Da Diva (1989). He featured in the 1992 Mani Ratnam  film Roja directed. (Roja was made in Tamil and later dubbed in Hindi, Marathi, Telugu and Malayalam.)

His strongest performance in the early part of his career came from his lead role of struggling scientist in the film Ek Doctor Ki Maut (1991), for which he was awarded the 1991 National Film Award – Special Jury Award.

In 2000 he returned to television with the serial Office Office a satirical take on the prevalent corruption in India.

In 2003 he appeared in Maqbool, Vishal Bhardwaj's adaptation of Shakespeare's Macbeth. His antagonistic performance as the short-statured, potbellied, shuffle-footed Abbaji in Maqbool got him the 2004 National Film Award for Best Supporting Actor. Meanwhile, he released films like The Blue Umbrella (2005), Dus (2005) and Halla Bol (2007). In 2006, he started to be seen again on TV. In the TV series, Naya Office Office, a sequel to his previous series Office Office.

On 11 January 2013, the Vishal Bharadwaj-directed film Matru Ki Bijlee Ka Mandola, starring Kapur was released.

In November 2019, Kapur made his literature debut with his novella 'Dopehri''', which he had written in 1992. Presently he appears in the television series named ‘Naya Office Office’ which itself is a sequel to the previous hit TV series ‘Office Office’.

Filmography

 Director 
 Mausam (2011) Starring Shahid Kapoor, Sonam Kapoor, Jaspal Bhatti
 Mohandas B.A.L.L.B. (1998)

 Writer Sau Jhooth Ek Sach (2005)

 Television 
 Karamchand (Season 1) (1985–1988)
 Mungerilal Ke Haseen Sapne (1989-1990)
 Zabaan Sambhalke (Season 1) (1993-1994) as Mohan Bharti
 Neem Ka Ped (1991) as Budhai Ram
 Phatichar (1991)
 Lifeline with Vijaya Mehta
 Zabaan Sambhalke (Season 2) (1997-1998) as Mohan Bharti
 Mohandas B.A.L.L.B. (1997-1998)
 Office Office (2000) as Musaddi Lal 
 Bharat Ek Khoj Tehreer as Munshi Premchand Ki – Godaan by Doordarshan (2004) 
 Kab Tak Pukaroon Naya Office Office (2006–2009)
 Karamchand (Season 2) (2007)
 JL50'' (2020)

Dubbing roles

Live action films

Awards and nominations

References

External links

 
 
 Interview with Pankaj Kapoor 16 October 2002

1954 births
Living people
Punjabi people
Male actors from Ludhiana
Indian male film actors
Indian male television actors
National School of Drama alumni
Male actors in Hindi cinema
20th-century Indian male actors
21st-century Indian male actors
Best Supporting Actor National Film Award winners
Male actors in Konkani cinema
Male actors in Hindi television
Film directors from Punjab, India
21st-century Indian film directors
Indian television directors
Screenwriters from Punjab, India
21st-century Indian dramatists and playwrights
Filmfare Awards winners
Screen Awards winners
Special Jury Award (feature film) National Film Award winners
Zee Cine Awards winners
21st-century Indian screenwriters